John Michael Lyston (May 28, 1867 – October 29, 1909) was an American professional baseball player who played in one game for the Columbus Solons during the  season and one game for the Cleveland Spiders during the  season. He was born in Baltimore, Maryland, and died there at the age of 42.

External links

1867 births
1909 deaths
19th-century baseball players
Major League Baseball pitchers
Columbus Solons players
Cleveland Spiders players
Worcester Grays players
Hartford (minor league baseball) players
New Haven Nutmegs players
Providence Clamdiggers (baseball) players
Winston-Salem Blue Sluggers players
Harrisburg Senators players
Altoona Mud Turtles players
Peoria Distillers players
Gloversville Glovers players
Baseball players from Baltimore